Politika is a Serbian daily newspaper, published in Belgrade. Founded in 1904 by Vladislav F. Ribnikar, it is the oldest daily newspaper still in circulation in the Balkans.

Publishing and ownership
Politika is published by Politika novine i magazini (PNM), a joint venture between Politika a.d. and East Media Group. The current director of PNM is Mira Glišić Simić.

PNM also publishes:
Sportski žurnal
Politikin Zabavnik
Svet kompjutera
Ilustrovana Politika
Bazar

Editorial history
Vladislav F. Ribnikar (1904–1915)
Miomir Milenović i Jovan Tanović (1915–1941)
Živorad Minović (1985–1991)
Aleksandar Prlja (1991–1994)
Boško Jakšić (1994)
Dragan Hadži Antić (1994–2000)
Vojin Partonić (2000–2001)
Milan Mišić (2001–2005)
Ljiljana Smajlović (2005–2008)
Radmilo Kljajić (2008)
Dragan Bujošević (2008–2013)
Ljiljana Smajlović (2013–2016)
Žarko Rakić (2016–2021)
Marko Albunović (since 2021)

History
Ever since its launch in January 1904, Politika was published daily, except for several periods:
Due to World War I, there were no issues from 14 November 1914 to 21 December 1914, and again from 23 September 1915 to 1 December 1919
Due to World War II, there were no issues from 6 April 1941 to 28 October 1944
In protest against government's intentions to turn Politika into a state-owned enterprise, a single issue was not published in the summer of 1992 

The launch issue had only four pages and a circulation of 2,450 copies, and its record high circulation was the 25 December 1973 issue (634,000 copies).

Reporting during the Yugoslav Wars

In the run-up to and during the breakup of Yugoslavia and the Yugoslav Wars, Politika was under the control of Slobodan Milošević and the League of Communists of Serbia and was used for political purposes. It was used to publish controversial things such as the "Vojko i Savle" article, as well as an information guide to show what was allegedly happening to the Serbs in other republics, together with the Radio Television of Serbia. It blamed the local Kosovo Albanians for sodomizing Đorđe Martinović, and published fabricated reader letters claiming that the Albanians were "raping hundreds of Serbian women". Before and during the Croatian War of Independence, it published opinions on how "blood may shed again" in Croatia because of World War II, published claims on how the Vatican funded Croatia to break up Yugoslavia. At the end of the Battle of Vukovar, it ran the fabricated story of the Vukovar children massacre. The article was however retracted with a statement published the following day.

References

External links

 

Mass media in Belgrade
Newspapers published in Serbia
Newspapers published in Yugoslavia
Publications established in 1904
Serbian brands